Some examples of Shinto architecture
Shinto architecture is the architecture of Japanese Shinto shrines.

With a few exceptions like Ise Grand Shrine and Izumo Taisha Shinto shrines before Buddhism were mostly temporary structures erected to a particular purpose. Buddhism brought to Japan the idea of permanent shrines and the presence of verandas, stone lanterns, and elaborate gates are some which are used both in a Shinto shrine and a Buddhist temple.

The composition of a Shinto shrine is extremely variable, and none of its possible features are necessarily present. However, since its grounds are sacred, they usually are surrounded by a fence made of stone or wood called , while access is made possible by an approach called . The entrances themselves are straddled by gates called , which are therefore the implest way to identify a Shinto shrine.

A shrine may include within its grounds several structures, each destined to a different purpose.

Before the forced separation of Shinto and Buddhism, it was not uncommon for a Buddhist temple to be built inside or next to a shrine or to the contrary for a shrine to include Buddhist subtemples. At the same time, temples in the entire country adopted tutelary  ( and built temple shrines called  to house them. After the forcible separation of Buddhist temples and Shinto shrines ordered by the new government in the Meiji period, the connection between the two religions was officially severed, but continued nonetheless in practice.

The origin of shrines

The practice of marking sacred areas began in Japan as early as the Yayoi period (from about 500 BC to 300 AD) originating from primal Shinto tenets. Later, temporary buildings similar to present day portable shrines were constructed to welcome the gods to the sacred place. Over time the temporary structures evolved into permanent structures that were dedicated to the gods. Ancient shrines were constructed according to the style of dwellings (Izumo Taisha) or storehouses (Ise Grand Shrine). The buildings had gabled roofs, raised floors, plank walls, and were thatched with reed or covered with hinoki cypress bark. Such early shrines did not include a space for worship. They are exemplified by Izumo Taisha, Nishina Shinmei Shrine and Sumiyoshi Taisha respectively and date to before 552. In this manner, ancient styles have been replicated through the centuries to the present day.

Common features

The following is a diagram illustrating the most important elements of a Shinto shrine:
 – Shinto gate
Stone stairs
 – the approach to the shrine
 or  – fountain to cleanse one's hands and face
 – decorative stone lanterns
 – the shrine's administrative office
 – wooden plaques bearing prayers or wishes
/ – small auxiliary shrines
 – the so-called "lion dogs", guardians of the shrine
 – oratory
 – fence surrounding the 

Gate

The  is a gate which marks the entrance to a sacred area, usually but not necessarily a shrine. They can be found in different places within a shrine's precincts to signify an increased level of holiness.

 can often be found also at Buddhist temples, however they are an accepted symbol of Shinto, and as such are used to mark shrines on maps.

They may for example have originated in India as a derivative of the  gates in the monastery of Sanchi, which is located in central India.

Pathway

The  is the road approaching either a Shinto shrine or a Buddhist temple. Its point of origin is usually straddled in the first case by a Shinto , in the second by a Buddhist , gates which mark the beginning of the shrine's or temple territory. There can also be stone lanterns and other decorations at any point along its course.

Fountain

Guardian lion-dogs

The two "lions" in front of a shrine are in effect warden dogs called . They are almost identical, but one has the mouth open, the other closed. This is a very common pattern in statue pairs at both temples and shrines, and has an important symbolic meaning. The open mouth is pronouncing the first letter of the sanskrit alphabet ("a"), the closed one the last ("um"), representing the beginning and the end of all things. The one with the open mouth is called , the other , a name that in time came to be used for both animals.

Worship hall

The  is the hall of worship or oratory of the shrine. It is generally placed in front of the shrine's main sanctuary and often built on a larger scale than the latter.

Offertory hall

It can also be called  or in other ways, and its position can sometimes vary. In spite of its name, nowadays it is used mostly for rituals.

Sanctuary

The , also called  is the most sacred building of shrine, intended purely for the use of the  enshrined . The , in itself incorporeal, is usually represented physically by a mirror or sometimes by a statue. The building is normally in the rear of the shrine and closed to the general public. The sections

Other elements

The two terms used to have different meanings, but must be today considered synonyms. For this reason, this kind of shrine is now sometimes called .

Most common shrine styles

Shrine buildings can have many different basic layouts, usually named either after a famous shrine's  (e.g. , named after Hiyoshi Taisha), or a structural characteristic (e.g. , after the hip-and-gable roof it adopts. The suffix  in this case means "structure".)

The 's roof is always gabled, and some styles also have a veranda-like aisle called  (a 1- wide corridor surrounding one or more sides of the core of a shrine or temple).
Among the factors involved in the classification, important are the presence or absence of:

 or  – a style of construction in which the building has its main entrance on the side which runs parallel to the roof's ridge (non gabled-side).
 or  – a style of construction in which the building has its main entrance on the side which runs perpendicular to the roof's ridge (gabled side).

Proportions are also important.

Larger, more important shrines tend to have unique styles.

This is the feature which gives the style its name, the most common among shrines all over the country. 

Sometimes the basic layout consisting of an elevated  partially surrounded by a veranda called  (all under the same roof) is modified by the addition of a room in front of the entrance. The  varies in roof ridge length from 1 to 11 , but is never 6 or 8 . The most common sizes are 1 and 3 . Its external dimensions are 5x3 , but internally it is composed of three  measuring 1  each.

as a style takes its name from Kasuga Taisha's . It is characterized by the extreme smallness of the building, just 11  in size. In Kasuga Taisha's case, this translates in 1.9 m  2.6 m. Supporting structures are painted vermillion, while the plank walls are white.

Other styles
Follows a list of other styles (in alphabetical order). Many are rare, some unique. Most deal with the structure of a single building but others, for example the  style, define instead the relationship between member structures. In that case, the same building can fall under two separate classifications. Because they are connected by a passage called  and are covered by a single roof, however, the complex is classified as belonging to the style (also called ).

The name comes from Nikkō Tōshō-gū in Nikkō because it enshrines the Tōshō Daigongen.

is a style used at Hachiman shrines in which two parallel structures with gabled roofs are interconnected on the non-gabled side, forming one building which, when seen from the side, gives the impression of two. There are entrances at the center of the non-gabled side. In general, the rear structure is 32 , while the front one is 31.

The actual width and height of this room vary with the shrine.

Extant examples are Usa Shrine and Iwashimizu Hachiman-gū. This style, of which only five Edo period examples survive, may be of Buddhist origin, since some Buddhist buildings show the same division. For example, Tōdai-ji's  is divided in two sections laid out front and back. Structural details also show a strong relationship with the Heian period style called  used in aristocratic residences. Another possible origin of this style may have been early palaces, known to have had parallel ridges on the roof.

The building is composed of a 3x2 ken core called moya surrounded on three sides by a 1-ken wide hisashi, totaling 5x3 ken (see photo). The three-sided hisashi is  unique and typical of this style. The gabled roof extends in small porticos on the front and the two gabled sides. The roof on the back has a peculiar and characteristic shape.

Irimoya-zukuri

 is a honden style having a hip-and-gable structure, that is, a gabled roof with one or two hips, and is used for example in Kitano Tenman-gū's honden. The style is of Chinese origin and arrived in Japan together with Buddhism in the 6th century. It was originally used in the Kon-dō and Kō-dō (lecture halls) of Buddhist temples, but started to be used also in shrines later, during the Japanese Middle Ages.

The name derives from its . In Japan the gable is right above the edge of the shrine's moya, while the hip covers the hisashi. In lay architecture it is often called just moya-zukuri. Extant examples are Mikami Shrine in Shiga prefecture and Yasaka Shrine in Kyoto.

Ishi-no-ma-zukuri

The floor of each of the three halls can be at a different level. If the ai-no-ma is paved with stones it is called ishi-no-ma, whence the name of the style. It can, however, be paved with planks or tatami. Its width is often the same as the honden'''s, with the haiden from one to three ken wider.

One of the oldest examples is Kitano Tenman-gū in Kyoto. The gongen-zukuri name comes from Nikkō Tōshō-gū in Nikkō, which enshrines the Tōshō Daigongen (Tokugawa Ieyasu) and adopts this structure.

Kibitsu-zukuri

The gables are set at a right angle to the main roof ridge, and the honden is part of a single complex also including a haiden (worship hall). Kibitsu Shrine in Okayama, Okayama Prefecture, Japan is the sole example of this style.

Misedana-zukuri
 owes its name to the fact that, unlike the other shrine styles, it doesn't feature a stairway at the entrance, and the veranda is completely flat.  It is normally used only in sessha and massha, tiny, 1 ken shrines sometimes found on the premises of larger ones. They can however be as small as beehives or relatively large and have 1x2, 1x3 or even, in one case, 1x7 bays. Apart from the lack of a staircase, such shrines belong to the nagare-zukuri or kasuga-zukuri styles and have their entrance on the non-gabled (hirairi) or gabled side (tsumairi).

Ōtori-zukuri
The  is a tsumairi style named after Ōtori taisha in Ōsaka. Its floor is elevated and 2x2 ken in size, without a veranda or railings. This style seems to have the same origins as the ancient sumiyoshi- and taisha-zukuri styles, which it resembles, and the absence of a veranda may be due to the use in origin of an earthen floor, still in use in some shrines. The interior is divided in two, naijin (inner chamber) and gejin (outer chamber). The roof is covered with layers of cypress bark shingles and has a high ridge with an ornamental rather than functional role. It does not curve upwards at the eaves and the bargeboards are simple and straight.  Chigi and three katsuogi are present.

Owari-zukuri

 is a complex style found in large shrines of what used to be called Owari province, near Nagoya. It features many structures within the same compound, among them a honden, a haiden, a tsuriwata-rō (a suspended passageway), a yotsuashimon (a gate built with four pillars), and other buildings. Extant examples of this style include Owari Ōkunitama Shrine and Tsushima Shrine.

Primitive shrine layout without honden
This style is rare, but historically important. It is also unique in that the honden, normally the very center of a shrine, is missing. It is believed shrines of this type are reminiscent of what shrines were like in prehistorical times. The first shrines had no honden because the shintai, or object of worship, was the mountain on which they stood. An extant example is Nara's Ōmiwa Shrine, which still has no honden. An area near the haiden (hall of worship), sacred and taboo, replaces it for worship. Another prominent example of this style is Futarasan Shrine near Nikkō, whose shintai is Mount Nantai. For details, see Birth and evolution of Shinto shrines above.

Ryōnagare-zukuri

 is an evolution of the nagare-zukuri in which the roof flows down to form a portico on both non-gabled sides. Examples are the honden at Itsukushima Shrine and at Matsuo Taisha.

Shinmei-zukuri

 is an ancient style typical of, and most common at Ise Grand Shrine, the holiest of Shinto shrines. It is most common in Mie prefecture. Characterized by an extreme simplicity, its basic features can be seen in Japanese architecture from the Kofun period (250–538 C.E.) onwards and it is considered the pinnacle of Japanese traditional architecture. Built in planed, unfinished wood, the honden is either 3x2 ken or 1x1ken in size, has a raised floor, a gabled roof with an entry on one the non-gabled sides, no upward curve at the eaves, and decorative logs called chigi and katsuogi protruding from the roof's ridge. The oldest extant example is Nishina Shinmei Shrine, the shrine which gives the style its name.

Sumiyoshi-zukuri

 takes its name from Sumiyoshi-taisha's honden in Ōsaka. The building is 4 ken wide and 2 ken deep, and has an entrance under the gable. Its interior is divided in two sections, one at the front and one at the back with a single entrance at the front. Construction is simple, but the pillars are painted in vermilion and the walls in white.

The style is supposed to have its origin in old palace architecture Another example of this style is Sumiyoshi Jinja, part of the Sumiyoshi Sanjin complex in Fukuoka Prefecture. In both cases, as in many others, there is no veranda.

Taisha-zukuri

 is the oldest shrine style, takes its name from Izumo Taisha and, like Ise Grand Shrine's, has chigi and katsuogi, plus archaic features like gable-end pillars and a single central pillar (shin no mihashira). Because its floor is raised on stilts, it is believed to have its origin in raised-floor granaries similar to those found in Toro, Shizuoka prefecture.

The honden normally has a 2x2 ken footprint (12.46x12.46 m in Izumo Taisha's case), with an entrance on the gabled end. The stairs to the honden are covered by a cypress bark roof. The oldest extant example of the style is Kamosu Jinja's honden'' in Shimane Prefecture, built in the 16th century.

Gallery

See also
 List of Shinto shrines in Japan
 Glossary of Shinto

Notes

References

Bibliography

 
Japanese architectural styles